Corigliano d'Otranto is a small town and comune of 5,632 inhabitants in the province of Lecce in Apulia, Italy. It is one of the nine towns of Grecìa Salentina.
The inhabitants of Corigliano, alongside Italian, also speak Griko, a Greek dialect.

Sister cities
 Ilion, Greece

Cities and towns in Apulia
Grecìa Salentina
Localities of Salento